Cnemidochroma coeruleum is a species of beetle in the family Cerambycidae
. It was described by Achard in 1910. It is known from Suriname, French Guiana, and Brazil.

References

Callichromatini
Beetles described in 1910
Beetles of South America